The province of South Papua (Provinsi Papua Selatan) in Indonesia is divided into four kabupaten (regencies) which in turn are divided administratively into districts, known as distrik under the law of 2001 on "special autonomy for Papua province".

List
The districts of South Papua and their respective regencies are as follows (as of July 2022). Administrative villages (desa in rural areas and kelurahan in urban areas) are also listed for each district.

See also
List of districts of West Papua

References

South Papua